CrossCountry (legal name XC Trains Limited) is a train operating company in the United Kingdom owned by Arriva UK Trains, operating the Cross Country franchise.

The CrossCountry franchise was restructured by the Department for Transport (DfT) in 2006, incorporating elements of both the Central Trains and the Virgin CrossCountry franchises, ahead of its invitation to tender on October of that year. On 10 July 2007, the DfT announced that Arriva had been awarded the New Cross Country franchise. CrossCountry is one of only two franchised train operating companies that does not manage any stations, the other being Caledonian Sleeper. CrossCountry's services have been periodically disrupted by industrial action amongst its staff, often due to disputes over rostering and pay. While the franchise had been originally due to conclude on 31 March 2016, multiple subsequent agreements have been enacted; in October 2020, the DfT confirmed that the franchise has been extended for a further three years for a finish date of 15 October 2023.

At the commencement of operations, CrossCountry's rolling stock consisted of 34 four-car Class 220 Voyagers and 40 five-car and 4 four-car Class 221 Super Voyagers from Virgin CrossCountry as well as 11 two-car and 18 three-car Class 170 Turbostars from Central Trains. As per its franchise agreement, it obtained ten Class 43 power cars and forty Mark 3 carriages to operate on services that required greater seating capacity, while some Super Voyagers were transferred to Virgin West Coast. Overhauls of the Voyager & Super Voyager fleets were performed, the removal of the shop to fit more seating and storage being a prominent change; the Mark 3 carriages were also refurbished to provide suitable amenities for modern travellers. Both the Super Voyagers and Turbostar fleets have been extended where possible to provide more capacity.

It operates intercity and other long-distance passenger trains across Great Britain, but does not serve Greater London. While some services on the West Coast Main Line were promptly discontinued with the introduction of a new timetable on 9 December 2007, with some transferring over to both Virgin Trains West Coast and to First TransPennine Express, new services, such as a daily  to  service introduced during December 2008, were also implemented.

History

Formation
During June 2006, the Department for Transport (DfT) announced its intention to restructure a number of the existing railway franchises. As a result of these changes,  a 'New Cross Country' franchise was produced, which incorporated the existing InterCity Cross Country franchise run by Virgin CrossCountry, while excluding those services ran on the West Coast Main Line (while the Birmingham to Scotland services were transferred to Virgin Trains West Coast and the Manchester to Scotland services transferring to First TransPennine Express). Several services from the Central Trains franchise were also to be added.

In October 2006, the DfT issued the invitation to tender (ITT) to the four shortlisted bidders: Arriva, FirstGroup, National Express and Virgin Rail Group.

Transfer and withdrawal of services
After taking over the franchise, CrossCountry continued to operate the existing timetable including the West Coast Main Line services for four weeks.

The ITT did not require retention of the services beyond  after December 2008, so the services to both  and  soon ceased. As a result of these changes, all CrossCountry services now completely avoid Greater London.

Changes to services
Starting in December 2008, a daily  to  service was introduced. From May 2011, a number of services were extended from Edinburgh to Glasgow to replace East Coast services.

By mid-2020, CrossCountry had considerably curtailed its services in response to the significant decline of passenger travel amid the COVID-19 pandemic. From 15 June 2020, both passengers and staff on public transport in England, including CrossCountry services, were required to wear face coverings while travelling, and that anyone failing to do so would be liable to be refused travel or fined.

Extension of the franchise
While the franchise had been originally due to conclude on 31 March 2016, during August 2013, it was announced that it had been extended until December 2019. At one point, it had been expected that an ITT would be issued in October 2018 for the next franchise, however, during September 2018, it was announced that the competition had been cancelled so that the recommendations from a report into the franchise system could be incorporated. In July 2019, the Direct Award was further extended by one year, moving the expiry date back to October 2020. During September 2020, it was announced that the emergency agreements with train operating companies introduced due to the COVID-19 pandemic in the United Kingdom were to be extended for 18months, and that all passenger rail franchising in Great Britain was abandoned. In October 2020, the DfT confirmed that the franchise had been extended for three years, putting the finishing date back to 15 October 2023.

Industrial action

During November and December 2017, CrossCountry on-board train managers and senior conductors affiliated with the National Union of Rail, Maritime and Transport Workers (RMT) staged five 24-hour and two 48-hour strikes in an industrial dispute regarding staff rostering, in particular in relation to working on Sundays. Further strikes had been planned for January 2018, but these were cancelled after CrossCountry and the RMT came to an agreement over staff working conditions on 11 January.

Separate strike action was later threatened by the Transport Salaried Staffs' Association (TSSA) union later that month, with strikes planned for 26 January. These were in relation to CrossCountry staff being offered a 1% pay rise, compared to a 3.3% pay rise for staff at other Arriva-owned train operating companies. As a result of an agreement with CrossCountry to match their demands for an equal pay rise, the planned industrial action by the TSSA was cancelled.

CrossCountry is one of several train operators affected by the 2022–2023 United Kingdom railway strikes , the first national rail strike in the UK for three decades. Its workers were amongst those who voted in favour of industrial action due to a dispute over pay and working conditions. CrossCountry was capable of operating only a very minimal timetable on any of the planned dates for the strikes due to the number of staff involved.

Services

The company operates medium- and long-distance services that run outside of the London area. The network is centred at Birmingham New Street station. Services can be categorised into two types:
 Inter-City: long-distance, fast services between the South of England and the North of England or Scotland via Birmingham, these routes are typically operated by Voyagers or HST sets.
 Regional: medium-distance, stopping or semi-fast services between Birmingham and other cities in the Midlands, as well as some longer runs to Wales and West Anglia. These are usually operated by Turbostars.

CrossCountry's official website does show a distinction between the two types of services (for example, each has a separate timetable booklet), but does not explicitly call them Inter-City and Regional.

Core
, the Monday-Friday daytime services, with frequencies in trains per hour (tph), include:

These services combine to provide higher frequencies between Birmingham and the following major destinations:
 Wolverhampton, Stoke-on-Trent, Macclesfield, Stockport and Manchester: two trains per hour
 Derby: three trains per hour
 Sheffield, York, Darlington and Newcastle: one train per hour via Leeds
 Nottingham: two trains per hour
 Leicester: two trains per hour
 Leamington Spa, Oxford and Reading: two trains per hour (including one via Coventry)
 Cheltenham: three trains per hour
 Bristol: two trains per hour

The Sunday service pattern is mostly similar to the weekday one, except that the hourly Birmingham - Nottingham services do not run while the other services do not start until late morning or early afternoon, and often have a slightly different stopping pattern.

Extensions

The above table shows the basic service pattern; however, a small number of these services are extended beyond their usual destination:
 from Plymouth to 
 travelling via  either in lieu of, or in addition to Stoke-on-Trent

Special services

There were two services Monday to Saturday in each direction with one in each direction on Sundays. These ran express to Weymouth from Bournemouth.

Proposed services
During December 2016, CrossCountry published a consultation document for changes to the timetable proposed to be implemented in December 2017. These included:
 Increasing the frequency of services during peak times on several routes;
 An additional service to and from  running in the early afternoon.

To allow these changes to take place, all CrossCountry services on some routes (which had a limited service) would be withdrawn and replaced with extra services run by other operators. These included:

In April 2017, it was announced the proposed changes would not be proceeding.

Stations served only by CrossCountry
CrossCountry does not manage any stations, although there are stations managed by other train operating companies at which it is the only operator: five stations (and ) are managed by East Midlands Railway, while three stations (and ) are managed by West Midlands Trains. At  station, which has tracks and platforms at two levels, the high-level platforms are served only by CrossCountry, but the entire station is managed by West Midlands Trains, which serves the low-level platforms.

 was served only by CrossCountry until 2013, when Abellio Greater Anglia started running one train every two hours at the station in addition to the CrossCountry services there.

Other route information
To improve the travelling experience, CrossCountry has designated four stations as alternative changeover stations: these are Cheltenham Spa, Derby, Leamington Spa and Wolverhampton. Connection times can be shorter at these smaller stations. For example, passengers travelling from Cardiff to Edinburgh could change at Cheltenham – where both their trains use the same platform – instead of Birmingham New Street, a larger, more complex station.

Rolling stock

CrossCountry services are operated using diesel trains only, since none of the routes it operates are fully electrified.

CrossCountry inherited 34 four-car Class 220 Voyagers and 40 five-car and 4 four-car Class 221 Super Voyagers from Virgin CrossCountry as well as 11 two-car and 18 three-car Class 170 Turbostars from Central Trains.

In December 2007 Class 221 Super Voyagers 221101 - 113 and 221142 - 144 were transferred to Virgin Trains West Coast with 221114 - 118 following in December 2008.

A franchise commitment was the acquisition of ten Class 43 power cars and forty Mark 3 carriages. Midland Mainline had six Class 43 power cars and fourteen Mark 3 carriages that were off lease from November 2007 that were leased.  The remaining four Class 43 power cars were ex Virgin CrossCountry examples in varying states of decay, while the carriages were five ex-Virgin CrossCountry Mark 3 carriages and twenty-one ex-Virgin Trains West Coast loco-hauled Mark 3B carriages. Most had been in store at Long Marston for a few years.

After driver training the ex-Midland Mainline sets returned to service in May 2008 on Glasgow and Edinburgh to  diagrams while the other Class 43 power cars were overhauled at Brush Traction including repowering with MTU engines and the Mark 3 carriages overhauled at Doncaster Works to a similar specification as GNER's Mallard refurbishments. Once these were completed, the ex-Midland Mainline examples were also overhauled.

High Speed Trains were hired from East Coast and East Midlands Trains on a number of occasions to operate services from Edinburgh Waverley to Plymouth when HSTs or Voyagers were unavailable.

During 2008, the Class 170 Turbostar fleet was refurbished, during which the three-carriage units repainted at Marcroft Engineering, Stoke on Trent, the two-carriage units at EWS's Toton depot and the interiors renewed by Transys Projects, Clacton-on-Sea, including the fitting of first-class seating to the Class 170/5s and 170/6s.

The tilt function on the Class 221 Super Voyagers was removed in 2008; tilting was not required on the parts of West Coast Main Line that CrossCountry serves. CrossCountry stated this change would improve reliability and reduce maintenance costs.

Between 2008 and 2009, both the Class 220 Voyagers and Class 221 Super Voyagers underwent refurbishment at Bombardier Transportation's Derby Litchurch Lane Works. This work involved the removal of the shop, adding 25% extra luggage space and fourteen extra standard-class seats to the Class 220 Voyagers and 20% extra luggage space and sixteen extra standard-class seats to the Class 221 Super Voyagers. Three years later, a refresh of the interiors was conducted, during which the standard-class seats were re-covered in the existing red and blue moquette and while the first class seats were finished with a maroon moquette. In summer 2014, CrossCountry began removing the quiet coach designation from such vehicles across its Voyager fleet, believing them to be outdated and to take up an excessive amount of space on a four-car unit; however, it did retain the quiet coaches on its five HST sets.

During November 2017, as a part of CrossCountry's franchise extension, two former Virgin Trains Class 221 Super Voyager driving cars of unit 221144 were reactivated, having been stored at Central Rivers TMD for several years. Two of the existing five-car sets releasing a centre carriage that, when combined with the reactivated pair of driving cars, formed an additional four-car set to be formed.

In 2021, six of the existing two-carriage Class 170s were lengthened. This happened as a result of East Midlands Railway only leasing the two-carriage driving vehicles of the West Midlands Railway 170/6 sets, hence six centre cars became available when they were replaced by West Midlands Trains for transfer to CrossCountry. The last InterCity 125s are scheduled to be withdrawn in October 2023.

Current rolling stock

Future rolling stock
It has been proposed that, around 2023, CrossCountry should operate all of the s cascaded from East Midlands Railway to provide extra capacity.

Notes

References

External links

 

|-

Arriva Group companies
Companies based in Birmingham, West Midlands
Railway companies established in 2007
Train operating companies in the United Kingdom
2007 establishments in the United Kingdom